The Kamani Massacre took place on July 9, 1993, during the Georgian-Abkhaz conflict. It was perpetrated against Georgian inhabitants of Kamani (a small village located north of Sukhumi), mainly by militia forces of Abkhaz separatists, and their North Caucasian and Russian allies. It became a part of the bloody campaign carried out by the separatists, which was known as the ethnic cleansing of Georgians in Abkhazia

Events
During the War in Abkhazia in 1992-93, the villages along the Gumista River (north and east of Sukhumi) such as Kamani, Shroma, and Achadara were mainly populated by ethnic Georgians. 

However, the area was very important strategically, as it enabled motorized units to reach Sukhumi, the capital of the autonomous republic. After the failed attempt to storm Sukhumi from the west, the Abkhaz formations and their allies diverted their offensive on the northern and eastern sides of Sukhumi. On July 2, 1993 under the Russian military directives and naval support, the Abkhaz and their allies (Confederation of Mountain Peoples of the Caucasus) landed in Ochamchire and attacked the villages on the Gumista river. The Georgian National Guard, volunteer units and battalions made up by local civilians, were taken by surprise. The Georgian side did not expect any offensive from the north or eastern sides of Sukhumi district. Due to this manoeuvring, the Abkhaz and their allies cut through the Georgian front line and attacked the villages along the side of Gumista river. The Georgian side suffered many losses and the defensive line around Sukhumi was breached by the Abkhaz offensive. On July 5, Abkhaz, Russian, Armenian Bagramyan battalion and North Caucasian detachments stormed the villages of Akhalsheni, Guma and Shroma of Sukhumi district. The residents from the villages were rounded up and massacred. The last offensive took place on July 9, on the village of Kamani. Kamani was a Svan (sub-ethnic group of the Georgian people) village which also included the Kamani Monastery (named after St George) and convent (populated by priests and nuns).

The Georgian forces who were protecting the pathways to Kamani were annihilated early in the morning after which the main assault on the village was undertaken at 10 a.m. Within a couple of hours the village fell to Abkhaz separatists and their allies. Soon after the Abkhaz and their allies started a violent rampage against the inhabitants of Kamani. Women, children, and the elderly were systematically tortured, raped and massacred during the two days of violence. The church and convent in Kamani became the scene of a blood bath. The female nuns were raped and later killed in front of the orthodox priest father Yuri Anua and father Andria (the overseer of the convent). After witnessing the massacres of nuns the Georgian priests were taken outside of the church and while kneeling were interrogated. 

“They questioned father Andria on the ownership of land in Abkhazia. He refused to answer. They questioned him repeatedly and finally he gave up and said: Abkhazia, like the rest of the world, belongs to God. They shot him soon after. Before doing so, they forced a young Abkhaz priest to kill him. He resisted and was killed near the Georgian priest. They left their corpses near the church and left".

After the July events of 1993, Kamani remains completely depopulated and all houses in the village are abandoned by the surviving inhabitants. After taking this strategic area, Abkhaz and their allies launched a large scale offensive on Sukhumi which by now was encircled by the separatist forces.

See also
Ethnic cleansing of Georgians in Abkhazia
Georgian-Abkhaz conflict
Sukhumi Massacre
United Nations resolutions on Abkhazia

References

External links
Video file capturing Kamani tragedy 
Video file, Father Anua before the massacre 

Massacres in 1993
Abkhaz–Georgian conflict
Russian war crimes in Georgia (country)
Massacres in Georgia (country)
Ethnic cleansing of Georgians in Abkhazia
1993 in Georgia (country)
1993 in Abkhazia
Mass murder in 1993
Anti-Georgian sentiment
July 1993 events in Asia
1993 murders in Georgia (country)